Windu Hanggoro Putra (born August 21, 1988 in Jakarta) is an Indonesian footballer who currently plays for Persita Tangerang in the Liga Indonesia Premier Division.

Club statistics

References

External links

1988 births
Association football midfielders
Living people
Indonesian footballers
Liga 1 (Indonesia) players
PSPS Pekanbaru players
Persija Jakarta players
Sportspeople from Jakarta